Ugo Panizza is an Italian economist. He is a professor of International Economics and Pictet Chair in Finance and Development at the Graduate Institute of International and Development Studies in Geneva. He is a vice-president of the Centre for Economic Policy Research (CEPR)., the director of the International Center for Monetary and Banking Studies, the editor in Chief of Oxford Open Economics and International Development Policy, and the deputy director of the Centre for Finance and Development.

Diplomas 
Panizza holds a PhD in economics from the Johns Hopkins University and a Laurea (BA) from the University of Turin.

Contributions 
Panizza is known for co-establishing the concept of original sin in development economics, alongside economists Barry Eichengreen and Ricardo Hausmann. His work on the costs of sovereign default (joint with Eduardo Borensztein, Eduardo Levy Yeyati, Federico Sturzenegger, and Jeromin Zettelmeyer), on the links between finance and economic development (joint with Jean Louis Arcand and Enrico Berkes), and on the relationship between public debt and economic growth (joint with Andrea Presbitero) has been widely cited in the international press.

In 2012 Panizza coauthored (with Jean-Louis Arcand and Enrico Berkes) an IMF working paper titled Too Much Finance showing that the relationship between financial development and economic growth goes from being positive to negative when the financial sector becomes too large.

In 2016 he coauthored a paper with Barry Eichengreen titled "A Surplus of Ambitions". The paper concludes that Europe’s crisis countries are unlikely to be able to run primary budget surpluses as large and persistent as officially projected.

He has contributed to the debate on Quantitative Easing in Europe and on the monetary and fiscal stimulus in the Eurozone. In 2017 he coauthored with David Miles, Ricardo Reis, and Angel Ubide the 19th Geneva Report on the World Economy titled And Yet It Moves. The report asks why inflation has remained so stable in the aftermath of the Great Recession.

In 2017 he co-authored (with Jeromin Zettelmeyer and Eike Kreplin) a Peterson Institute working paper aimed at assessing debt sustainability in Greece and wrote a Project Syndicate piece with Ricardo Hausmann discussing the possibility of creating an odiousness rating system.

Career 
He has taught at the University of Turin and at the American University of Beirut. He also worked at the World Bank, the Inter-American Development Bank, and at the United Nations Conference on Trade and Development (UNCTAD) where he was the head of the Debt and Finance Analysis Unit. Currently Panizza is professor of International Economics and Pictet Chair in Finance and Development at the Graduate Institute of International and Development Studies in Geneva, where he is also the deputy director of the Centre for Finance and Development. Panizza is a CEPR Research Fellow, and a former editor of Economia (the Journal of Latin American and Caribbean Economic Association, LACEA).  He is a member of the editorial board of several other academic journals.

References 

Living people
Italian economists
Academic staff of the Graduate Institute of International and Development Studies
Johns Hopkins University alumni
Year of birth missing (living people)